Chalcis is a city on the Euripus Strait between the island of Euboea and the Greek mainland.

Other cities of Antiquity:
 Chalcis (Aeolis), a town of ancient Aeolis, now in Turkey
 Chalcis (Aetolia), a town of ancient Aetolia
 Chalcis (Elis), a town of ancient Elis
 Chalcis (Epirus), a town of ancient Epirus
 Chalcis, modern Qinnasrin, Syria
 Chalcis (Thrace), modern Inecik in European Turkey
 Chalcis sub Libanum, modern Anjar, Lebanon

It can be also:
 Chalcis Mountain, near the Chalcis in Aetolia
 Chalcis Province, a province in Euboea, Central region in Decentralized Administration of Thessaly and Central of Greece
 Chalcis (wasp), a genus of Chalcid wasp
Chalcis (mythology), the naiad.

See also 
  
 Colchis